Loutros is a small village located in the Nicosia District of Cyprus, west of the town of Karavostasi.  De facto, it is under the control of Northern Cyprus.

Loutros was originally inhabited by Greek Cypriots; they all fled during the 1974 Turkish invasion. The village was reinhabited in the late 1970s by Turkish Cypriots from Xerovounos, and a small number of Turks from Turkey and displaced Turkish Cypriots from Terra and Mandria.

References

Communities in Nicosia District
Populated places in Lefke District
Greek Cypriot villages depopulated during the 1974 Turkish invasion of Cyprus